Iranian Film Festival Australia (IFFA) is a film festival held in Australia with a focus on Iranian films.
IFFA was founded in 2011 and is now in its tenth year. It is considered to be a key Iranian cultural event in Australia by many iranians.
IFFA is the only nation-wide festival in Australia dedicated to Iranian films.

The festival has been hosted by Mercury CX.
In IFFA 2016, the film Life and a Day by Saeed Roostaee won the Network for the Promotion of Asian Cinema Award.

References

External links
Official Website

Film festivals in Australia
Australian film awards
Awards established in 2011
2011 establishments in Australia
Annual events in Australia
Film festivals established in 2011
Iranian-Australian culture